Jalapa was a Guatemalan professional football club that played in the Liga Nacional, the top level division in the country. They were based in Jalapa, and their home stadium was the Estadio Las Flores.

History
The team was founded on July 10, 1978.
First promotion  to the Liga Mayor A in 1981, played there until 1991 when lost their category descending to Liga Mayor B.
Having been promoted to the Liga Nacional in 2001 under coach Benjamín Monterroso, Jalapa won the domestic cup three times, in 2002, 2005, and 2006.

The club's biggest achievement has been winning the 2007 Apertura tournament, which was the first national championship won in the club's history. The title earned them a berth in the CONCACAF Champions League 2008-09.

Jalapa won their second league championship by defeating Guatemalan great C.S.D. Municipal in the Claus 2009 final. This was their second championship in two years.

2010's
After Jalapa become champions, they entered into an economic situation resulting in the departure of most of the players, they were relegated to the Liga de Ascenso Nacional.
Things did not change for them, they had more economic issues which resulted in their relegation to the Segunda Division and continue being relegated until the team folded.

2012
A new team plays in the same stadium Las Flores called Los Tigres de Jumay which won the Tercera Division and promoted to Segunda Division.

Honours
 Liga Nacional de Guatemala titles: 2
Apertura 2007, Clausura 2009
 Copa de Guatemala titles: 3
2002, 2005, 2006

List of football coaches
 Jaime Ormazabal (1981)
 Efrain II Santander (1988)
 Jaime Batres (1990-1991)
 Óscar Enrique Sánchez
 Juan Alberto Salguero
 Benjamín Monterroso (2000–01)
 Julio César Cortés (2005)
 Carlos Jurado (2006–08)
 Hector Trujillo (2009)
 Ariel Longo (2009–10)

References

External links
 all the informacion about Jalapa
 Unofficial web site

Jalapa
Association football clubs established in 1978
1978 establishments in Guatemala